The Fire Station and City Hall at 224 N. Guadalupe St. in San Marcos, Texas was built in 1915. It was listed on the National Register of Historic Places in 1983.

It is a two-story buff brick building.  It was designed by Austin architect Roy L. Thomas.

References

Fire stations on the National Register of Historic Places in Texas
National Register of Historic Places in Hays County, Texas
Buildings and structures completed in 1915